Dorin Drăguţanu (born 19 March 1974) is an economist from Moldova. He was born in Chişinău and has served as the head of the National Bank of Moldova since November 2009 until April 2016, when was replaced by Sergiu Cioclea.

In 1996 Dorin Drăguțanu graduated from the Department of Economy (Finance and Banks) of Alexandru Ioan Cuza University. During 1998-2003 he pursued his studies in the authorized centre of the Association of Chartered Certified Accountants in Bucharest. Dorin Drăguţanu worked for PricewaterhouseCoopers (1998–2008).

References 

1974 births
Living people
Businesspeople from Chișinău
Alexandru Ioan Cuza University alumni
Moldovan economists
Governors of National Bank of Moldova